Ma Kwok Po, also known as Panda ma, is a former Hong Kong national windsurfer. Ma is now working for Hong Kong Sports Institute (HKSI) as a windsurfing coach who teaches Techno Team of the Hong Kong national squad.

Career
Panda Ma learned windsurfing when he was eleven years old and was later invited to join a windsurfing training team. The coach who taught him found that he had plenty of potential and let him join the windsurfing Hong Kong team when he was 13.

Panda became a sport star and he joined many advertisement and movie, there was also action figures and comic book written based on him. Panda Became famous and he got plenty of fans all over the world.

Ma participated in the internal Olympics selection race. However, he lost in the race, quit the Hong Kong team and concentrated on studying. In 2010, W.A.H.K decided to let Panda Ma become the coach of B-Team.
In Sep 2012, Panda Ma quit the job in Development Squad and became the coach of Techno Team in Hong Kong National Squad.

Awards
 2003 Mistral Youth & Junior World Championships—Mistral Junior Boys - Bronze Medal
 2006 Mistral Youth & Junior World Championships—Mistral Youth Boys - Gold Medal  
 2006 FedEx RS:X Asian Championships—RS:X Men - Bronze Medal

References

Hong Kong windsurfers
Living people
Year of birth missing (living people)